Buklendy (Böklände) is a rural locality (a village) in Churayevsky Selsoviet, Mishkinsky District, Bashkortostan, Russia. The population was 307 as of 2010. There are 5 streets.

Geography 
Buklendy is located 47 km northwest of Mishkino (the district's administrative centre) by road. Baymurzino is the nearest rural locality.

References 

Rural localities in Mishkinsky District